Eucyclidae is a family of  gastropods in the superfamily Seguenzioidea (according to the taxonomy of the Gastropoda by Bouchet & Rocroi, 2005).

This family has no subfamilies.

Genera 
Genera within the family Eucyclidae include:
 Amberleya J. Morris & Lycett, 1851 †
 Bathybembix Crosse, 1893
 Calliomphalus Cossmann, 1888 †
 Calliotropis Seguenza, 1903
 Cidarina Dall, 1909
 Echinogurges Quinn, 1979
 Eucycloidea Hudleston, 1888 †
 Ginebis Is. Taki & Otuka, 1943
 Lischkeia Fischer, 1879
 Putzeysia Sulliotti, 1889
 Riselloidea Cossmann, 1909 †
 Spinicalliotropis Poppe, Tagaro & Dekker, 2006
 Tibatrochus Nomura, 1940
 Toroidia Hoffman & Freiwald, 2018
 Turcica Adams & Adams, 1854
Genera brought into synonymy
 Bembix R. B. Watson, 1879 : synonym of Bathybembix Crosse, 1893 (Invalid: Junior homonym of Bembix Fabricius, 1775 [Hymenoptera])
 Convexia Noda, 1975 : synonym of Ginebis Is. Taki & Otuka, 1943
 Mazastele Iredale, 1936 : synonym of Calliotropis Seguenza, 1903
 Ptychostylis Gabb, 1865 : synonym of Turcica Adams & Adams, 1854
 Solaricida Dall, 1919 : synonym of Calliotropis L. Seguenza, 1903 (synonym)
 Solariellopsis Schepman, 1908 : synonym of Calliotropis (Schepmanotropis) Poppe, Tagaro & Dekker, 2006 represented as Calliotropis L. Seguenza, 1903 (Invalid: junior homonym of Solariellopsis de Gregorio, 1886; Schepmanotropis is a replacement name)
 Turcicula Dall, 1881 : synonym of Lischkeia P. Fischer, 1879

References 

 Koken, E. (1896). Die Gastropoden der Trias um Hallstadt. Jahrbuch der Kaiserlich-Königlichen Geologischen Reichsanstalt. 46(1): 37−126
 Wenz W. (1938-1944). Gastropoda. Teil 1: Allgemeiner Teil und Prosobranchia. xii + 1639 pp. In: Schindewolf, O.H. (Ed.) Handbuch der Paläozoologie, Band 6. Bornträger, Berlin. Lief. 1, 1-240
 Hickman C. S. & McLean J. H. (1990). Systematic revision and suprageneric classification of trochacean gastropods. Science Series of Natural History Museum of Los Angeles County 35: 1-169
 Bouchet P. & Rocroi J.-P. (2005). Classification and nomenclator of gastropod families. Malacologia. 47(1-2): 1-397 
 Bouchet P., Rocroi J.P., Hausdorf B., Kaim A., Kano Y., Nützel A., Parkhaev P., Schrödl M. & Strong E.E. (2017). Revised classification, nomenclator and typification of gastropod and monoplacophoran families. Malacologia. 61(1-2): 1-526

External links
 Bandel K. (2010). Relationships of the Triassic Eucycloidea Koken, 1897 (Mollusca, Gastropoda) to modern genera such as Pagodatrochus, Calliotropis and Euchelus, based on morphology of the early shell. Bulletin of Geosciences. 85(3): 435-486
 Kano, Y.; Chikyu, E.; Warén, A. (2009). Morphological, ecological and molecular characterization of the enigmatic planispiral snail genus Adeuomphalus (Vetigastropoda: Seguenzioidea. Journal of Molluscan Studies. 75(4): 397-418
 Ferrari, S. M.; Kaim, A.; Damborenea, S. E. (2014). The genera Calliotropis Seguenza and Ambercyclus n. gen. (Vetigastropoda, Eucyclidae) from the Early Jurassic of Argentina. Journal of Paleontology. 88(6): 1174-1188